KJP may refer to:
 Karnataka Janata Paksha, a political party in India
 Kerama Airport, identified by the IATA code KJP
 Eastern Pwo language, a Karenic language, identified by the ISO 639 3 code kjp
 Karine Jean-Pierre, White House Press Secretary